Coreopsis integrifolia, the fringeleaf tickseed or mouse-ear tickseed, is a North American plant species of the family Asteraceae.  It is native to the southeastern United States, in South Carolina, Georgia, and northern Florida.

Coreopsis integrifolia is a perennial up to 60 cm (2 feet) tall. Flower heads have yellow ray florets and purple disc florets.

References

External links
Plants of Calhoun County, Florida includes photo of herbarium specimen
Nature in Focus photo

integrifolia
Flora of the Southeastern United States
Plants described in 1811